Fighting Back, released in 1986, is a live album by the British heavy metal band Cloven Hoof. Unusually for a live album, it features a selection of new tracks not featured on previous albums, although the song "Eye of the Sun" would later resurface on their 2006 album of the same name and "Reach For the Sky" and "The Fugitive" were used on the follow-up 1988 album, Dominator. This is the only Cloven Hoof release to feature singer Rob Kendrick, and the last with guitarist Steve Rounds and drummer Kevin Poutney before breaking up the band.

Track listing
All songs written by Lee Payne, unless indicated otherwise.
Side one
"Reach for the Sky" - 8:02
"The Fugitive" - 5:16 
"Daughter of Darkness" - 4:26  
"Heavy Metal Men of Steel" - 8:03

Side two
"Raised on Rock" - 4:48 
"Break It Up" (Payne, Steve Rounds) - 4:26 
"Could This Be Love?" - 4:02
"Eye of the Sun" - 5:58

Credits
Rob Kendrick - vocals
Steve Rounds - guitar
Lee Payne - bass
Kevin Poutney - drums

References

Cloven Hoof (band) albums
Live New Wave of British Heavy Metal albums
1986 live albums